Hartshorne is a surname. Notable people with the surname include:

Anna Cope Hartshorne (1860–1957), American educator in Japan 
Arthur Hartshorne, American ice dancer 
Charles Hartshorne (1897–2000), philosopher
Edward Y. Hartshorne (1912-1946), principal education officer in the American Military Government responsible for the reopening of the German universities in the U.S. occupation zone after World War II
Lawrence Hartshorne, merchant and political figure in Nova Scotia 
Lawrence Hartshorne, Jr., hardware merchant and political figure in Nova Scotia 
Richard Hartshorne (1899–1992), geographer
Richard Hartshorne (judge), United States federal judge
Robin Hartshorne (born 1938), mathematician
Sarah Hartshorne, contestant of America's Next Top Model, Cycle 9